Our Girl Friday (U.S. title The Adventures of Sadie) is a 1953 British comedy film starring Joan Collins, George Cole, Kenneth More and Robertson Hare. It is about a woman who is shipwrecked with three men on a deserted island.

The film was based on the Australian writer Norman Lindsay's 1934 novel The Cautious Amorist.

Plot
A ship collision results in four survivors from an ocean liner winding up on a desert island: spoiled heiress Sadie, lecturer Professor Gibble, journalist Jimmy Carrol and ship's stoker Pat Plunket.

Carrol falls in love with Sadie and she kisses him. Gibble falls in love with Sadie. This causes conflict between Carrol and Gibble that results in Sadie wanting to move to the other side of the island to live alone.

Gibble gets the wrong impression that Pat and Sadie are intimate. Pat finds a bottle of rum and gets drunk.

Sadie takes over as leader on the island.  When the men threaten to strike, she declares that the group will never function until she marries one of the men. They draw straws and Gibble gets the short straw, but tries to back out in favour of Pat. Then a ship appears and the group is rescued.

Safe on the ship, Gibble falls in love with Sadie again and asks her to marry him. So does Carrol. However, Sadie is in love with Pat, but he refuses her marriage proposal, saying they are too different. But Sadie persuades the ship's captain that Pat is obliged to marry her, but before it can happen that ship goes down.

Sadie wades ashore at the same island where Pat has already arrived.

Cast
Joan Collins as Sadie Patch
George Cole as Jimmy Carrol
Kenneth More as Pat Plunkett
Robertson Hare as Professor Gibble
Hermione Gingold as Spinster
Walter Fitzgerald as Captain
Hattie Jacques as Mrs. Patch
Felix Felton as Mr. Patch
Lionel Murton as Barman

Production
Norman Lindsay's novel The Cautious Amorist was published in 1931. It was banned in parts of Australia.

Film rights were purchased in 1948. It was to be written and directed by Noel Langley and Robertson Hare was attached as a star. The original producer was John Sutro and the working title was Sadie was a Lady. Lucille Ball was going to be the female star. Then Jane Russell was going to play it. By now George Minter was producer and the title was The Girl on the Island. The film ended up not being made until several years later.

Joan Collins was borrowed from J. Arthur Rank to appear in the film. She wrote in her memoirs, "It was an absolutely gorgeous part. And funny, too. My yen to play comedy was developing. The script was hilarious and the three actors who were in it were important stars."

"I wore a bikini and no make up", said Collins later. "It was quite restful and more like a holiday than work." Collins later claimed she was the first actress to appear in a bikini on screen in this film. Her character tears up a shirt into a makeshift one. 

The movie was mostly shot on location in Majorca, Spain, with studio work done in London. More's fee was £4,500. Filming began 22 June 1953.

Peter Sellars has an uncredited cameo has the voice of a cockatoo.

Reception
Although the film was released after Genevieve (1953), which made More a star, it performed disappointingly at the box office. He later wrote the film "was not so successful as we had hoped. We had all enjoyed ourselves making it, but the result was a bit of a disappointment".

Variety said it "does not come up to expectations".

References

External links

1953 films
1953 romantic comedy films
British romantic comedy films
Films about castaways
Films set on uninhabited islands
20th Century Fox films
Films with screenplays by Noel Langley
Films directed by Noel Langley
Films produced by Noel Langley
Films based on works by Norman Lindsay
1950s English-language films
1950s British films